German Davydov (born 10 March 1994) is a Russian rugby union player who generally plays as a fly half represents Russia internationally.

Career 
He was called up to join the Russian rugby sevens team for the 2013 Summer Universiade and was subsequently a key member of the team which won the gold medal in the men's rugby sevens tournament.

He made his international debut for Russia against Emerging Ireland on 13 June 2014 at the 2014 IRB Nations Cup.

He was selected to the Russian squad for the 2017–18 World Rugby Sevens Series. He was also named in the national squad for the men's tournament at the 2018 Rugby World Cup Sevens.

He was included in the Russian squad for the 2019 Rugby World Cup which was held in Japan for the first time and also marked his first World Cup appearance. He was also part of the national side which participated at the 2020 Rugby Europe Championship and 2021 Rugby Europe Championship.

References 

Russian rugby union players
Russia international rugby union players
Living people
1994 births
Rugby union fly-halves
VVA Podmoskovye players
Universiade gold medalists for Russia
Universiade medalists in rugby sevens
Medalists at the 2013 Summer Universiade